The Horsehair eel (Gordiichthys irretitus) is an eel in the family Ophichthidae (worm/snake eels). It was described by David Starr Jordan and Bradley Moore Davis in 1891. It is a marine, tropical eel which is known from the western central Atlantic Ocean, including Florida, USA, the Gulf of Mexico and Puerto Rico.

References

Ophichthidae
Fish described in 1891
Taxa named by David Starr Jordan